Virginia United FC is an Australian football (soccer) club located in Nundah. It was originally based in the nearby suburb of Virginia from which the club gets its name. Virginia United has existed since 1970 and serves as the local club for Nundah and its surrounding suburbs. After achieving promotion from Capital League 2 in 2017, the club will compete in the Brisbane Premier League in 2018 for the first time in its history.

History
Virginia United FC was established in 1970 and originally played at the ARC Hill Park in Goss Road, Virginia.

The club first fielded a senior men’s team in Brisbane competition in 1979, joining the league in Division Five for that season. After winning the 1982 Division Four grand final and the 1983 Division Three premiership, the club reached Division Two in 1984. Virginia United’s next success was winning the 1990 Division Five premiership and grand final double. They went on to win the 1993 Division Four premiership before their senior side went into recess after the 1994 season.

Virginia United’s senior men’s team re-emerged in 2008 and competed in the Metro League until the reorganisation of the Football Brisbane structure in 2013 which resulted in the club being placed in Capital League 3 for that season. After finishing mid-table for a couple of seasons, Virginia United finished top of the Capital League 3 table in 2016 and also won the grand final on penalties against Toowong.

Further success followed in 2017 with Virginia United claiming second spot in the Capital League 2 table to win promotion to the Brisbane Premier League for the first time in the club’s history. The club were also crowned 2017 champions, beating the premiers Centenary Stormers 2-1 in the grand final.

Recent seasons

Senior men 

Source:

The tier is the level in the Australian soccer league system

Senior women

Honours

Senior men 
Brisbane Division 4 – Champions 1982
Brisbane Division 3 – Premiers 1983
Brisbane Division 5 – Premiers and champions 1990
Brisbane Division 4 – Premiers 1993
Capital League 3 – Premiers and champions 2016
Capital League 2 – Champions 2017
Source:

Senior women 

 Capital League - Premiers and champions 2016

References

External links
 

Soccer clubs in Brisbane
Brisbane Premier League teams
Association football clubs established in 1970
1970 establishments in Australia
Nundah, Queensland